The National Association of Black and White Men Together, Inc.: A Gay Multiracial Organization for All People (NABWMT) is a network of chapters across the United States focused on LGBT and racial equality, founded in May, 1980 in San Francisco as a consciousness-raising, multicultural organization and support group for gay men forming multiracial relationships. To attain these ends, its local chapters organized social gatherings and engaged in educational, cultural, and political activities. It is a registered IRS 501(c)(3) nonprofit organization. NABWMT's goals consist of two major themes: combating racism within the LGBT community and combating homophobia in general society. NABWMT's vision is to be a key organizational and archival resource for those working on racial and social justice. An overall goal is to witness an America free of racism and homophobia.

History and Impact
NABWMT got its start in May 1980 when founder Michael Smith placed an advertisement in The Advocate for a potluck that attracted 20 people. Within a year of its founding, local chapters were established in New York, Boston, Philadelphia, Washington DC, Los Angeles, Memphis, Chicago, Detroit, Atlanta, and Milwaukee. Chapters named "Black and White Men Together," "Men of All Colors Together," "GREAT (Gay Racially Equal And Together) Men of (city)," and "People of All Colors Together" which include women, all operate under the NABWMT umbrella. Local chapters host social and educational events, and also support other aspects of their communities. For example, the Detroit chapter raised funds for and provided direct assistance to the Ruth Ellis Center in 2006.

As a result of AIDS education and support work carried out by chapters, the National Task Force on AIDS Prevention (NTFAP) and Bay Area HIV Support and Education Services (BAHSES) both sprung from NABWMT in the late 1980s. In 1980, Reggie Williams, an executive director of NABWMT and NTFAP, began to reach out to Black gay and bisexual men, as well as other gay men of color communities in San Francisco.

Conventions
The first national convention was held in San Francisco in 1981

Notable Convention Speakers 
Walter Naegle (Bayard Rustin's partner for the last decade of Rustin's life (1977–87)), and historian, Dr. Martin Duberman, Newark, 2015.
United States Surgeon General Dr. Joycelyn Elders, San Diego, 2012
Chris Bartlett, Executive Director of the William Way LGBT Community Center,  Philadelphia, 2009
Pauline Park, Cleveland, 2007
Ohio State Representative Sandra Williams, Cleveland, 2007
Joseph Fairchild Beam (editor of the ground-breaking anthology of black gay literature, In the Life, Milwaukee, 1987.

References

External links

Facebook
Men of All Colors Together Boston records
Guide to the Men of All Colors Together/New York Records 1980-2006
Stuart A. Rose Manuscript, Archives, and Rare Book Library, Emory University: *National Association of Black and White Men Together collection, circa 1980-1999

Gay culture in the United States
Gay men's organizations
African-American LGBT organizations
LGBT political advocacy groups in the United States
Men's organizations in the United States
Anti-homophobia
History of LGBT civil rights in the United States
Men in the United States
Multiracial affairs in the United States
Organizations established in 1980
1980 establishments in the United States
Interracial relationships
Organizations based in Los Angeles County, California
White American culture